Günter Hermann Ewen (1962 – 18 May 1999) was a German mass murderer who killed four people and wounded at least nine others in Dillingen, Germany on 16 May 1999, before escaping to Sierck-les-Bains, France, where he killed another person, and wounded two more. Hunted by German and French police, he eventually committed suicide in a hotel in Strassen, Luxembourg on 18 May.

Life
Ewen was born in Dillingen in 1962, being the youngest and only boy among five siblings, and suffered from asthma from childhood. He showed little interest at school, had to repeat two grades and left Hauptschule after grade seven, whereupon he started an apprenticeship as a paver, which he quit after two years due to his ailment. Up to the age of 30 he lived with his parents and mostly worked odd jobs to earn money.

According to conflicting reports Ewen began to consume alcohol excessively either at the age of twelve or eighteen, animated by one of his sisters' boyfriends, whom he admired for his rather wasteful lifestyle. As a youth he was arrested for theft, fraud, and battery, and starting in 1982 he was caught numerous times while driving under the influence of alcohol, which resulted in a three-month prison term when he was 26. Since 1990 he was arrested for acts of voyeurism and exhibitionism, and in February 1991 he was fined after masturbating in front of women at a tennis club. Six months later Ewen,whilst drunk, twice broke into a home for mentally disabled women and sexually molested them in their beds. One hour after the second such incident he raped a woman in her home.

In February 1993 Ewen was convicted of rape and sexual assault in three cases, and sentenced to a prison term of five years and six months. A psychologist found him to be a narcissist, who, in his infantile egocentrism, ruthlessly tried to satisfy his own needs, especially when under the influence of alcohol. In prison he was in therapy concerning his sex offences and was eventually released in October 1996, after serving two-thirds of his sentence.

Out of prison Ewen started his own business, but in August 1998 he was accused by his friend Robert Fisne of six counts of burglary, whereupon he was again arrested. He remained in remand until January 1999, when he was acquitted, since no incriminating evidence could be found and the testimony of Fisne, the only witness in the case, was vague and contradictory. Even though he left prison cleared of these accusations, the arrest turned out to be devastating to Ewen's personal life, as during this time his business went bankrupt, he lost his home, his girlfriend left him, and he had accumulated DM 60,000 in debt, while the DM 3,000 granted as compensation for his wrongful imprisonment were barely enough to pay his attorney.

Ewen eventually found shelter at the home of his sister and brother-in-law in Beckingen where he lived up to the day of the shooting and helped renovate the building.

Victims
Roland Dekow, 42, manager of "Xanadu"-discothèque
Unknown, 40, doorman at "Xanadu"-discothèque
Robert Fisne, 37
Shonnette Maxine Fisne, 41, wife of Robert Fisne
Étienne Kuster, 39

References

German mass murderers
Suicides by firearm in Luxembourg
1962 births
1999 suicides
Mass murder in 1999
German spree killers
People from Saarlouis (district)
Murder–suicides in Europe
1999 mass shootings in Europe